Asante Three Rivers Medical Center (TRMC; formerly known as Three Rivers Community Hospital, TRCH) is a 125-bed general acute care hospital located in Grants Pass in the U.S. state of Oregon. TRMC was built as a merger between two hospitals, Josephine Memorial (General) Hospital and Southern Oregon Medical Center in 2001.

History
Three Rivers Medical Center opened in June 2001 on a  campus. Originally a 98-bed hospital, the facility cost $52 million to build and was designed with an open floor plan. It was the first hospital in the state designated "Baby-Friendly".

In 2002, the hospital partnered with Oregon Health & Science University to place young surgeons in rural hospitals. The hospital outsourced management of their Three Rivers Home Care operations to LHC Group in September 2009. Uncompensated care at the community hospital totaled $19.8 million in 2008, $21.3 million in 2009, and $26.4 million in 2010.

In August 2012, Asante Health System broke ground on a new $30 million outpatient center at Three Rivers Medical Center. The new outpatient facility will house imaging, lab services, physical therapy, occupational therapy, speech therapy and urgent care spaces as well as physician offices and a conference center.

References

External links
Health Grades
Facebook

Hospital buildings completed in 2001
Hospitals in Oregon
Grants Pass, Oregon
Hospitals established in 2001
2001 establishments in Oregon
Buildings and structures in Josephine County, Oregon